Hoover's sign refers to one of two signs named for Charles Franklin Hoover:

 Hoover's sign (leg paresis)
 Hoover's sign (pulmonary)